Polyvinylcarbazole (PVK) is a temperature-resistant thermoplastic polymer produced by radical polymerization from the monomer N-vinylcarbazole. It is a photoconductive polymer and thus the basis for photorefractive polymers and organic light-emitting diodes.

History 
Polyvinylcarbazole was discovered by the chemists Walter Reppe (1892-1969), Ernst Keyssner and Eugen Dorrer and patented by I.G. Farben in the USA in 1937. PVC was the first polymer whose photoconductivity was known. Starting in the 1960s, further polymers of this kind were sought.

Production 
Polyvinylcarbazole is obtained from N-vinylcarbazole by radical polymerization in various ways. It can be produced by suspension polymerization at 180 °C with sodium chloride and potassium chromate as catalyst.  Alternatively, AIBN can also be used as a radical starter or a Ziegler-Natta catalyst.

Properties

Physical properties 
PVK can be used at temperatures of up to 160 - 170 °C and is therefore a temperature-resistant thermoplastic. The electrical conductivity changes depending on the illumination. For this reason, PVK is classified as a semiconductor or photoconductor. The polymer is extremely brittle, but the brittleness can be reduced by copolymerization with a little isoprene.

Chemical properties 
Polyvinylcarbazole is soluble in aromatic hydrocarbons, halogenated hydrocarbons and ketones. It is resistant to acids, alkalis, polar solvents and aliphatic hydrocarbons. The addition of PVC to other plastic masses increases their temperature resistance.

Use 

Due to its high price and special properties, the use of PVK is limited to special areas. It is used in insulation technology, electrophotography (e.g. in copiers and laser printers), organic light-emitting diodes and photovoltaic devices. In addition, PVC is a well researched component in photorefractive polymers and therefore plays an important role in holography. Another application is the production of cooking-proof copolymers with styrene.

See also
Organic photorefractive materials

References 

Thermoplastics
Semiconductor materials
Carbazoles